Danick Albertine Snelder (born 22 May 1990) is a Dutch handball player for SG BBM Bietigheim and the Dutch national team.

She participated at the 2011 World Women's Handball Championship in Brazil. She competed at the 2016 Summer Olympics, where the Dutch team placed fourth.

Achievements
EHF European League:
Winner: 2022
Bundesliga:
Winner: 2022

References

External links

1990 births
Living people
Dutch female handball players
People from Pijnacker-Nootdorp
Expatriate handball players
Dutch expatriate sportspeople in Germany
Dutch expatriate sportspeople in Hungary
Handball players at the 2016 Summer Olympics
Olympic handball players of the Netherlands
Ferencvárosi TC players (women's handball)
Siófok KC players
Handball players at the 2020 Summer Olympics
Sportspeople from South Holland
21st-century Dutch women